Hagen Reinhold (born 23 March 1978) is a German politician of the Free Democratic Party (FDP) who has been serving as a member of the Bundestag from the state of Mecklenburg-Vorpommern since 2017.

Political career
In parliament, Reinhold has been a member of the Committee on Building, Housing, Urban Development and Local Government since 2018. Since 2021, he has been serving as his parliamentary group’s spokesperson for the maritime industry.

In addition to his committee assignments, Reinhold has been part of the German delegation to the Baltic Sea Parliamentary Conference (BSPC).

In the negotiations to form a so-called traffic light coalition of the Social Democratic Party (SPD), the Green Party and the FDP under Chancellor Olaf Scholz following the 2021 federal elections, Reinhold was part of his party's delegation in the working group on building and housing, chaired by Kevin Kühnert, Christian Kühn and Daniel Föst.

Personal life
On 12 March 2020, during the COVID-19 pandemic, it was announced that Reinhold had tested positive for COVID-19.

References

External links

  

1978 births
Living people
Members of the Bundestag for Mecklenburg-Western Pomerania
People from Wismar
Members of the Bundestag 2021–2025
Members of the Bundestag 2017–2021
Members of the Bundestag 2009–2013
Members of the Bundestag for the Free Democratic Party (Germany)